Sarath Chandrasiri Muthukumarana   is a Sri Lankan Politician and a member of the Parliament of Sri Lanka from Anuradhapura. He belongs to the Sri Lanka Freedom Party.

References

Members of the 14th Parliament of Sri Lanka
Members of the 15th Parliament of Sri Lanka
Sri Lanka Freedom Party politicians
United People's Freedom Alliance politicians
1953 births
Living people
Sinhalese politicians